Carlos Armando Biebrich Torres (19 November 1939 – 14 January 2021) was a Mexican lawyer and politician from the Institutional Revolutionary Party. He was Governor of Sonora from 1973 to 1975.

Biography
Carlos Armando Biebrich Torres was born on 19 November 1939 in Sahuaripa, Sonora.

Before he turned 30, Biebrich Torres was subsecretary of the Secretariat of the Interior under President Luis Echeverría Álvarez.

Biebrich served as Governor of Sonora from 1973 to 1975. In October 1975 a group of Yaqui farmers took over some private property that they said had been unfairly taken from them. Governor Biebrich ordered the violent expulsion of the farmers, and several died. Biebrich was forced to resign; the incident was investigated and he was exonerated of any wrongdoing. President Echeverría expropriated the land at the end of his term and turned it over to the Yaqui farmers.

He also served as a deputy in the XLVII (1964-1967) and LX (2006-2009) Legislatures of the Mexican Congress, representing Sonora.

In 2002 he was part of the  Executive Committee, under the leadership of Roberto Madrazo Pintado.

Biebrich died of COVID-19 in Hermosillo on 14 January 2021, during the COVID-19 pandemic in Mexico.

References

1939 births
2021 deaths
Politicians from Sonora
20th-century Mexican lawyers
Governors of Sonora
Members of the Chamber of Deputies (Mexico) for Sonora
Institutional Revolutionary Party politicians
Mexican people of German descent
21st-century Mexican politicians
Universidad de Sonora alumni
Academic staff of the National Autonomous University of Mexico
People from Sahuaripa Municipality
Deaths from the COVID-19 pandemic in Mexico
20th-century Mexican politicians
Deputies of the LX Legislature of Mexico